HMS Cumberland was a 74-gun third rate ship of the line of the Royal Navy, launched on 19 August 1807 at Northfleet. During the Napoleonic wars she brought King William I of the Netherlands from London to The Netherlands.

In 1809, she took part in the Battle of Maguelone under Captain Philip Wodehouse.

On 12 March 1812, as the merchant ship  was returning from Lima and Cadiz, the French privateer Amelia captured her. However,  recaptured Ramoncita.

Cumberland was converted to serve as a prison ship in 1830.  She was renamed Fortitude in 1833.

She was eventually sold out of the service in 1870.

Notes

References

Ships of the line of the Royal Navy
Repulse-class ships of the line
1807 ships